Joe H. McMullen (May 9, 1924 – September 9, 1983) was an American football player, coach, and collegiate athletics administrator.  McMullen coached at Stetson University in the 1950 and 1951 seasons and at Washington & Jefferson College for the 1952 and 1953 seasons.  He was head football coach at University of Akron for seven seasons from 1954 through 1960, compiling a 30–28–3 record.  McMullen coached as an assistant at Penn State in the mid-1960s before being named head coach at San Jose State University.  He stayed at San Jose State for two seasons, 1969 and 1970, and tallied a record of 3–10.

Following his stint at San Jose State, McMullen was hired to be the athletic director at Marshall University in 1971.  He stayed at Marshall until 1979, when he was hired as athletic director at Towson State University—now known as Towson University.  McMullen died on September 9, 1983 from leukemia at the age of 59.

Head coaching record

Notes

References

1924 births
1983 deaths
Akron Zips football coaches
Brown Bears football coaches
Brown Bears football players
Marshall Thundering Herd athletic directors
San Jose State Spartans football coaches
Stetson Hatters football coaches
Toledo Rockets football coaches
Towson Tigers athletic directors
Washington & Jefferson Presidents football coaches
Deaths from leukemia